Pennsylvania Furnace is an unincorporated community located in Franklin Township, Huntingdon County and in Ferguson Township, Centre County, Pennsylvania, United States. Pennsylvania Furnace has a post office, located in Centre County, with ZIP code 16865.

See also 

 Warwick Furnace Farms
 Samuel Van Leer

References

Unincorporated communities in Huntingdon County, Pennsylvania
Unincorporated communities in Pennsylvania